Tago may refer to:
 Tago, Surigao del Sur
 UDP-N-acetylglucosamine—undecaprenyl-phosphate N-acetylglucosaminephosphotransferase